Rodolfo Echeverría Álvarez, better known as Rodolfo Landa (September 24, 1926 – February 14, 2004), was a Mexican actor, lawyer, public official and trade unionist. He served as a leader of the National Actors Association (ANDA) and the Mexican Theater Center of ITI-UNESCO, in addition to developing a theatrical career for which he won critical and public recognition. He was the brother of Luis Echeverría Álvarez, president of Mexico from 1970 to 1976.

References 

20th-century Mexican actors
Mexican stage actors
Mexican trade unionists
20th-century Mexican lawyers
1926 births
2004 deaths